Nothing Serious is a 2004 novel by French writer Justine Lévy. The novel presents an insight into the breakdown of marriage and its consequences. The story is a thinly disguised account of Carla Bruni's affair with Justine's then-husband Raphaël Enthoven, a philosophy professor, and son of publisher Jean-Paul Enthoven. The book was originally written in French, and was published in English in October 2005 by Melville House.

External links
"Nothing Serious" at Melville House, the book's publisher
"Nothing Serious" at Amazon.com
Book review of "Nothing Serious"

References

2004 French novels
Melville House Publishing books